The Championnat National de Premiere Division  is a football league featuring clubs from Togo, and is the primary competition of Togolese football. Founded in 1961, it is administered by the Togolese Football Federation.

2021−22 clubs

Group A
Anges FC (Notsé)
AS Gbohloé-Su des Lacs (Aného)
AS OTR (Lomé)
AS Togo-Port (Lomé)
Dynamic Togolais (Lomé)
Entente II (Lomé)
Gomido FC (Kpalime)
Kotoko FC (Lavié)

Group B
AC Semassi (Sokodé)
ASC Kara (Kara)
ASKO Kara (Kara)
Binah FC (Pagouda)
Ifodje Atakpamé (Atakpamé)
Kakadlé FC (Niamtougou)
Sara Sport FC (Bafilo)
Unisport FC (Sokodé)

Previous winners
Champions were: 

1961 : Étoile Filante (Lomé)
1962 : Étoile Filante (Lomé)
1963 : unknown champion
1964 : Étoile Filante (Lomé)
1965 : Étoile Filante (Lomé)
1966 : Modèle Lomé
1967 : Étoile Filante (Lomé)
1968 : Étoile Filante (Lomé)
1969 : Modèle Lomé
1970 : Dynamic Togolais (Lomé)
1971 : Dynamic Togolais (Lomé)
1972 : Modèle Lomé
1973 : Modèle Lomé
1974 : Lomé 1
1975 : Lomé 1
1976 : Lomé 1
1977 : no competition
1978 : AC Semassi (Sokodé)
1979 : AC Semassi (Sokodé)
1980 : OC Agaza (Lomé)
1981 : AC Semassi (Sokodé)
1982 : AC Semassi (Sokodé)
1983 : AC Semassi (Sokodé)
1984 : OC Agaza (Lomé)
1985 : ASFOSA (Lomé)
1986 : ASFOSA (Lomé)
1987 : Doumbé (Sansanné-Mango)
1988 : ASKO Kara (Kara)
1989 : ASKO Kara (Kara)
1990 : Ifodje (Atakpamé)
1991 : no competition
1992 : Étoile Filante (Lomé)
1993 : AC Semassi (Sokodé)
1994 : AC Semassi (Sokodé)
1995 : AC Semassi (Sokodé)
1996 : ASKO Kara (Kara)
1997 : Dynamic Togolais (Lomé)
1998 : no competition
1999 : AC Semassi (Sokodé)
2000 : competition didn't end
2001 : Dynamic Togolais (Lomé)
2002 : AS Douanes (Lomé)
2003–04 : Dynamic Togolais (Lomé)
2004–05 : AS Douanes (Lomé)
2005–06 : Maranatha (Fiokpo)
2006–07 : ASKO Kara (Kara)
2007–08 : no competition
2009 : Maranatha (Fiokpo)
2010 : no competition
2011–12 : Dynamic Togolais (Lomé)
2013 : Anges (Notsè)
2014 : AC Semassi (Sokodé)
2015 : no competition
2016–17 : AS Togo-Port
2017–18 : US Koroki (Tchamba)
2018–19 : ASC Kara (Kara)
2019–20 : ASKO Kara (Kara)
2021 : ASKO Kara (Kara)
2021–22 : ASKO Kara (Kara)

Performance by club

Topscorers

References

External links
League at fifa.com
League at soccerway.com

Football leagues in Togo
Togo
Sports leagues established in 1961
1961 establishments in Togo